Aircraftman (AC) or aircraftwoman (ACW) is the lowest rank in the British Royal Air Force (RAF) and the air forces of several other Commonwealth countries. In RAF slang, aircraftmen are sometimes called "erks".

Aircraftman ranks below leading aircraftman and has a NATO rank code of OR-1. It is now a training rank only and no airmen in productive service hold this rank. Aircraftmen do not wear any rank insignia. The rank was renamed air recruit (AR) in the Royal Air Force in July 2022.

History
The rank was introduced to the RAF in January 1919, replacing the ranks of "air mechanic", "private" and "clerk" that had been introduced under Air Memorandum No. 1 in March 1918. There were three grades: leading aircraftman (LAC), aircraftman 1st class (AC1) and aircraftman 2nd class. A similar grading existed for junior ratings in the Royal Navy. The rank of senior aircraftman (SAC) was introduced on 1 January 1951.

The lowest grade was an AC2; also colloquially known as an "AC plonk". With effect from 1 April 1964, the gradings of AC1 and AC2 were abolished, with "aircraftman" becoming the entry rank.

Bangladesh
The rank is used in the Bangladesh Air Force.

Royal Canadian Air Force
In the Royal Canadian Air Force, the rank is also known by the French term of aviateur. This was changed from private in spring 2015 when the RCAF changed the colour of its rank insignia from gold to pearl grey. It is the lowest rank in the RCAF. Prior to 1968 the rank of aircraftman was used in the RCAF as in other Commonwealth air forces. In August 2020, the rank was changed to aviator.

Royal Australian Air Force
The Royal Australian Air Force also uses both aircraftman and aircraftwoman.

Royal Malaysian Air Force
The Royal Malaysian Air Force has four aircraftman ranks:

 Leading aircraftman (laskar udara kanan)
 Aircraftman 1st class (laskar udara I)
 Aircraftman 2nd class (laskar udara II)
 Aircraftman recruit (perajurit muda)

Royal New Zealand Air Force
In the Royal New Zealand Air Force, the rank is known as "aircraftman", regardless of the person's sex, in line with "seaman" in the Royal New Zealand Navy.

Zimbabwe
The rank is used in the Air Force of Zimbabwe.

See also
RAF enlisted ranks
Airman

Footnotes

Military ranks of the Commonwealth
Military ranks of Australia
Former military ranks of Canada
Military ranks of the Royal Air Force
Air force ranks